Foton may refer to:

 Foton (satellite), two series of Russian scientific satellite and reentry vehicle programs
 Foton Motor, a Chinese commercial vehicle manufacturer based in Beijing
 Foton Tornadoes, a women's volleyball team in the Philippines

See also
 
 Futon, the Japanese traditional style of bedding
 Photon (disambiguation)